Pentamethylarsenic (or pentamethylarsorane)is an organometalllic compound containing five methyl groups bound to an arsenic atom with formula As(CH3)5.  It is an example of a hypervalent compound. The molecular shape is trigonal bipyramid.

History
The first claim to make pentamethylarsenic was in 1862 in a reaction of tetramethylarsonium iodide with dimethylzinc by A. Cahours. For many years all the reproductions of this proved fruitless, so the production proved not to be genuine. It was actually discovered by Karl-Heinz Mitschke and Hubert Schmidbaur in 1973.

Production
Trimethylarsine is chlorinated to trimethylarsine dichloride, which then reacts with methyl lithium to yield pentamethylarsenic.

As(CH3)3 + Cl2 → As(CH3)3Cl2 
As(CH3)3Cl2 + 2LiCH3 → As(CH3)5 + 2LiCl

Side products include As(CH3)4Cl and As(CH3)3=CH2.

Pentamethylarsenic is not produced by biological organisms.

Properties
Pentamethylarsenic smells the same as pentamethylantimony, but is otherwise unique.

The bond lengths in the molecule are for the three equatorial As−C bonds 1.975 Å and the two axial As−C bonds 2.073 Å.

The infrared spectrum of pentamethylarsenic shows strong bands at 582 and 358 cm−1 due to axial C-As vibration, and weaker bands at 265 and 297 cm−1 due to equatorial C-As vibration. Raman spectrum shows a strong feature at 519, 388, and 113 cm−1, and weak lines at 570 and 300 cm−1.

Reactions
Pentamethylarsenic reacts slowly with weak acids.  With water it forms tetramethylarsonium hydroxide As(CH3)4OH and trimethylarsenic oxide As(CH3)3O. With methanol, tetramethylmethoxyarsorane As(CH3)4OCH3 is produced. Hydrogen halides react resulting in the formation of tetramethylarsonium halide salts.

When pentamethylarsenic is heated to 100° it decomposes forming trimethylarsine, methane, and ethylene.

When trimethylindium reacts with pentamethylarsenic in benzene solution, a salt precipitates: tetramethylarsenic(V)tetramethylindate(III).

References

Organoarsenic compounds
Hypervalent molecules
Arsenic(V) compounds
Substances discovered in the 1970s